Guy-Elphège Anouman (born 13 June 1994) is a French sprinter who specialises in the 100 and 200 metres.

In 2011, Amouman established a new World Youth Best in the 200 m (indoor).

Anouman competed in the 200 metres at the 2010 Summer Youth Olympics in Singapore.

References

External links
 
 Guy-Elphège Anouman at FFA 

1994 births
Living people
French male sprinters
Athletes (track and field) at the 2010 Summer Youth Olympics
World Athletics Championships athletes for France
People from La Garenne-Colombes
Sportspeople from Hauts-de-Seine
20th-century French people
21st-century French people